Heartless is a 1995 Italian crime-drama film directed by Umberto Marino.

Cast 

Kim Rossi Stuart: Claudio Scalise
Cecilia Genovesi: Esther Cipriani
Massimo Ghini: Police Commissioner 
Massimo Wertmüller: Massimo Salvadori
Ludovica Modugno: Esther's mother 
Massimo Popolizio: Minister 
Federico Scribani: Judge  Isernia 
Clarita Gatto: Miriam
Valerio Mastandrea: Inzerillo 
Barbara Livi: Sonia
Stefania Rocca

References

External links

1995 films
Italian crime drama films
1995 crime drama films
1990s Italian films